Mohair (pronounced ) is a fabric or yarn made from the hair of the Angora goat. (This should not be confused with Angora wool, which is made from the fur of the Angora rabbit.) Both durable and resilient, mohair is notable for its high luster and sheen, and is often used in fiber blends to add these qualities to a textile. Mohair takes dye exceptionally well. It feels warm in winter as it has excellent insulating properties, while its moisture-wicking properties allow it to remain cool in summer. It is durable, naturally elastic, flame-resistant and crease-resistant. It is considered a luxury fiber, like cashmere, angora, and silk, and can be more expensive than most sheep's wool.

Mohair is composed mostly of keratin, a protein found in the hair, wool, horns and skin of all mammals, but mohair's special properties are unique to the Angora goat. While it has scales like wool, the scales are not fully developed, merely indicated. Thus, mohair does not feel the same way common or standard wool does.

Mohair fiber is approximately 25–45 microns in diameter.
It increases in diameter with the age of the goat, growing along with the animal. Finer, softer hair from younger animals is used (for example) in scarves and shawls; the thicker, coarser hair from older animals is more often used for carpets and in heavy fabrics intended for outerwear.

The term mohair is sometimes used to describe a type of material used for the folding roof on convertible cars. In this instance, mohair refers to a form of denim-like canvas.

Production

Shearing is done twice a year, in the spring and in the fall. One goat will produce  of mohair a year.  Shearing is done on a cleanly-swept floor and extra care is taken to keep the hair clean and free of debris. The hair is then processed to remove natural grease, dirt and vegetable matter. Mohair grows in uniform locks. The Angora goat is a single-coat breed, and unlike pygora or cashmere, there is no need to dehair a mohair fleece to separate the coarse hair from the down hair.

South Africa is the world's largest mohair producer as of 2013, supplying around 50% of the total world production.  Due to animal cruelty in the South African farms, Zara, H&M, Gap, Topshop, Lacoste, and many more will no longer sell mohair clothing.

History
Mohair is one of the oldest textile fibers in use.
The Angora goat is thought to originate from the mountains of Tibet, reaching Turkey in the 16th century. Fabric made of mohair was known in England by the early 18th century.
The word "mohair" was adopted into English sometime before 1570 from the Arabic: mukhayyar, a type of haircloth, literally "choice", from khayyara, "he chose".

In about 1820, raw mohair was first exported from Turkey to England, which then became the leading manufacturer of mohair products. The Yorkshire mills spun yarn that was exported to Russia, Germany, Austria, etc., as well as woven directly in Yorkshire.

Until 1849, the Turkish province of Ankara was the sole producer of Angora goats. Charles V is believed to be the first to bring Angora goats to Europe. Due to the great demand for mohair fiber, throughout the 1800s there was a great deal of crossbreeding between Angora goats and common goats. The growing demand for mohair further resulted in attempts on a commercial scale to introduce the goat into South Africa (where it was crossed with the native goat) in 1838, the United States in 1849, Australia from 1856 to 1875, and later still New Zealand. In 1849, Angora goats made their way to America as a gift from Turkey.

During the 1960s, a blend of mohair and wool suiting fabric known as Tonik or Tonic was developed in England. This had a shiny, color-changing appearance and was popular among rude boys and the mod subculture. Similar suits were worn by mod revivalists, skinheads, and fans of ska punk and two tone music during the early to mid-1980s.

Today, South Africa is the largest mohair producer in the world, with the majority of South African mohair being produced in the Eastern Cape. The United States is the second-largest producer, with the majority of American mohair being produced in Texas. Turkey also produces good-quality mohair. Because the goats are sheared once a year (different from South Africa), Turkey produces the longest mohair of the world.

In December 2006, the General Assembly of the United Nations proclaimed 2009 to be the International Year of Natural Fibres, so as to raise the profile of mohair and other natural fibers.

Uses

Mohair is used in scarves, winter hats, suits, sweaters, coats, socks and home furnishing. Mohair fiber is also found in carpets, wall fabrics, craft yarns, and many other fabrics, and may be used as a substitute for fur. Because its texture resembles fine human hair, mohair is often used in making high-grade doll wigs or in rooting customized dolls.

Mohair is a very soft yarn when compared with other natural and synthetic fibers. Due to mohair's lacking prominent, protruding scales along the hair's surface, it is often blended with wool or alpaca. Blending the heavily scaled wool helps the smooth mohair fibers hold their shape and stick together when spun into yarn.  Mohair is also valued for certain other unique characteristics: it is warmer than other fibers, even when used to make a light-weight garment, and is often blended with wool for this reason; and mohair fibers have a distinctive luster created by the way they reflect light. Combined with mohair's ability to absorb dyes exceptionally well, pure mohair yarns are usually recognizable for their vivid, saturated colours.

Fibers from young goats are softest and are used to manufacture yarn for clothing. Fibers from mature goats are used to produce such things as rugs and carpets. Mohair is also used in 'climbing skins' for randonnée skiing and ski touring. The mohair is used in a carpet allowing the skier an appropriate ascension method without sliding downhill.

Mohair industry worldwide
As of 2009, world output of mohair was estimated at around 5,000 tonnes a year, down from a high of 25,000 tonnes in the 1990s. South Africa accounts for 60% of total production. South African mohair is generally exported raw or semi-processed to textile makers in Europe, the UK and the Far East. Prices for adult mohair declined in 2010 while prices for kid mohair remained the same. An emerging market for mohair producers has been China.

U.S. subsidies for mohair production

During World War II, U.S. soldiers wore uniforms made of wool. Worried that domestic producers could not supply enough for future wars, Congress enacted loan and price support programs for wool and mohair in the National Wool Act of 1954 as part of the 1954 Farm Bill. Despite these subsidies, wool and mohair production declined. The strategic importance declined as well; the US military adopted uniforms made of synthetic fibers, such as dacron, and officially removed wool from the list of strategic materials in 1960. Nevertheless, the U.S. government continued to provide subsidies to mohair producers until 1995, when the subsidies were "eliminated effective with the marketing year ending December 31, 1995". In The Future of Freedom: Illiberal Democracy at Home and Abroad, Fareed Zakaria points out that the subsidies were reinstated a few years later, due in large part to the lobbying on behalf of the special interests of the subsidy recipients. By 2000, Congress had appropriated US$20 million for goat and sheep producers. As of 2002, mohair producers were still able to receive special assistance loans from the U.S. government, after an amendment to eliminate the subsidy was defeated.  The U.S. currently subsidizes mohair production under the Marketing Assistance Loan Program of the 2014 Farm Act.

In popular culture 
In the Elton John song "Bennie and the Jets," Bennie is said to wear a suit made of mohair.

On Seinfeld, season 5 episode 4, “The Sniffing Account”  Jerry, Kramer and Newman have reason to suspect that their accountant, Barry Profit, is taking their money and using it to buy illegal narcotics. Later, Jerry and Kramer realize that they were wearing the same mohair sweater during their encounters with Barry.

See also
 International Year of Natural Fibres

References

Further reading

External links

 Oklahoma State University, Breeds of Livestock - Angora goats
 

Wool
1960s fashion
1980s fashion